Chela Bon (1930–2010) was a Chilean film actress.

Selected filmography
 The House is Empty (1945)
 The Maharaja's Diamond (1946)
 Father Cigarette (1946)
 Si mis campos hablaran (1947)

References

Bibliography
 Grant, Barry Keith. Schirmer Encyclopedia of Film: Academy Awards - Crime Films. Schirmer Reference, 2007.

External links

1930 births
2010 deaths
Actresses from Santiago
Chilean expatriates in the United States
Chilean film actresses
Chilean people of English descent